Toto is an unincorporated community in Center Township, Starke County, in the U.S. state of Indiana.

History
An old variant name of the community was called Rye. The origin of the name Toto is obscure, but it could possibly be of Native American origin.

A post office was established at Toto in 1855, and remained in operation until it was discontinued in 1907.

Toto has a local reputation for an abundance of curio stores, giving it the nickname of "Indiana's Bargain Capital".

Toto has also been recognized for being the inspiration for the name of Dorothy's dog, "Toto", in the "Wizard of Oz" books by the author, L. Frank Baum, who resided for a time at nearby Bass Lake.

References

Unincorporated communities in Starke County, Indiana
Unincorporated communities in Indiana